Edison Bariano Lobão (born 5 December 1936) is a Brazilian politician. He served as governor of Maranhão from 15 March 1991 to 2 April 1994 and as minister of mines and energy in the national government under the Dilma Rousseff administration. He has also been a senator since 1987. He served as the President of the Senate in 2001.

References

Living people
1936 births
Governors of Maranhão
Presidents of the Federal Senate (Brazil)
Democratic Social Party politicians
Brazilian Democratic Movement politicians
Brazilian politicians convicted of crimes
People named in the Panama Papers
Energy ministers of Brazil